Richard Bagot may refer to:

Richard Bagot (writer) (1860–1921), English novelist and essayist
Richard Bagot (bishop) (1782–1854), English cleric

See also
Bagot (disambiguation)